Roberto Lonardo is a Uruguayan former footballer who played as a defender and midfielder.

Career 
Lonardo came to the United States in 1965 after playing with Racing Club de Montevideo. In 1967, he played in the United Soccer Association with Dallas Tornado. In 1969, he played in the North American Soccer League with Kansas City Spurs. In his debut season with Kansas he assisted in securing the division title. During the NASL offseason in 1969 he played in the Greater Los Angeles Soccer League with San Pedro Yugoslavs. 

In 1970, he returned to play with San Pedro Yugoslavs. In 1971, he signed with league rivals Rochester Lancers after the folding of Kansas. In his debut season with Rochester he was selected for the Third NASL All-Star team. He played with Rochester for four seasons, and played with the indoor team in 1971.

Managerial career 
In 1978, he was the assistant coach for the Buffalo Blazers in the National Soccer League. In June 1978, he succeeded Sam Buscarino as a player-coach for Buffalo.

References  
  

1943 births
Uruguayan footballers
Uruguayan football managers
Dallas Tornado players
Kansas City Spurs players
Rochester Lancers (1967–1980) players
United Soccer Association players
North American Soccer League (1968–1984) indoor players
North American Soccer League (1968–1984) players
Association football defenders
Association football midfielders
Canadian National Soccer League players
Canadian National Soccer League coaches
Living people